The 20th season of Law & Order premiered on NBC on September 25, 2009 which remained unchanged, for which it was moved from its previous time slot to air on Fridays at 8 p.m. ET for the NBC broadcast. L&O was moved to Monday nights on March 1, 2010, with a two-hour telecast at 9 p.m. ET, before settling into its new time slot at 10 p.m. the following week, March 8.
 
During the season, The Jay Leno Show in primetime was canceled, and Leno returned to the 11:35 pm Tonight Show because of affiliate dissatisfaction. Three more episodes of Law & Order were ordered to fill the primetime gap, increasing the number of episodes for the season to 23.

In early January 2010, NBC initially announced they were going to renew Law & Order for a 21st season. NBC's President of Primetime Entertainment at the time, Angela Bromstad, said, "I’m a "Law & Order" junkie... I wouldn’t want to be responsible for not having "Law & Order" break the record." However, on May 14, 2010, NBC abruptly cancelled Law & Order after 20 seasons on the air, tying it with Gunsmoke as American network television's longest-running, regularly scheduled primetime drama. The final episode aired on NBC on May 24, 2010.
 
The late announcement of the cancellation resulted in Law & Order not having a "series finale" episode. Had the series continued, it would have been the last to feature S. Epatha Merkerson, who prior to the cancellation announcement had herself announced that she would not return for the 21st season.
 
Although NBC canceled Law & Order, AMC Network investigated its revival;  however, attempts to revive the series failed, and according to series creator Dick Wolf, the series has "moved to the history books". However, on September 28, 2021, NBC announced that the show was being revived and a 21st season had been ordered.

Cast

Main cast
 Jeremy Sisto as Senior Detective Cyrus Lupo
 Anthony Anderson as Junior Detective Kevin Bernard
 S. Epatha Merkerson as Lieutenant Anita Van Buren
 Linus Roache as Executive Assistant District Attorney Michael Cutter
 Alana de la Garza as Assistant District Attorney Connie Rubirosa
 Sam Waterston as District Attorney Jack McCoy

Recurring cast
 Leslie Hendrix as M.E. Dr. Elizabeth Rodgers
 Ernie Hudson as Frank Gibson
 Carolyn McCormick as Dr. Elizabeth Olivet
 J. K. Simmons as Dr. Emil Skoda

Notable guest stars
In addition to above, Law & Order's notable guest stars included Annaleigh Ashford, Adam Driver, David Alan Basche, Ned Eisenberg, Camille Chen, John Bolger, Sean Nelson, Portia Reiners, Jim Gaffigan, Richard Thomas, Bill Sage, Deirdre O'Connell, Rob Corddry, Jenna Stern, Kate Burton, Elliott Gould, Peter Scanavino, Raúl Esparza, Samantha Bee, Rebecca Creskoff, Aaron Shaw, Debra Winger, Adriane Lenox, Julito McCullum, Tammy Blanchard, Tony Hale, Tony Roberts, Robin Weigert, Mark Linn-Baker, Clea DuVall, Doug E. Doug, David Costabile, Anna Gunn, Lindsey Vonn, Kathy Baker, Ben Schnetzer, Jonathan Cake, Amy Madigan, and Benjamin Bratt as Rey Curtis.

Episodes

References

External links
 Episode guide from NBC.com

 

20
2009 American television seasons
2010 American television seasons